Elizabeth of Sicily or Elisabeth of Sicily may refer to:
 Elizabeth of Sicily, Queen of Hungary (1261–1303)
 Elisabeth of Sicily, Duchess of Bavaria (1310–1349)